Browser isolation is a cybersecurity model which aims to physically isolate an internet user's browsing activity (and the associated cyber risks) away from their local networks and infrastructure.  Browser isolation technologies approach this model in different ways, but they all seek to achieve the same goal, effective isolation of the web browser and a user's browsing activity as a method of securing web browsers from browser-based security exploits, as well as web-borne threats such as ransomware and other malware. When a browser isolation technology is delivered to its customers as a cloud hosted service, this is known as remote browser isolation (RBI), a model which enables organizations to deploy a browser isolation solution to their users without managing the associated server infrastructure. There are also client side approaches to browser isolation, based on client-side hypervisors, which do not depend on servers in order to isolate their users browsing activity and the associated risks, instead the activity is virtually isolated on the local host machine. Client-side solutions break the security through physical isolation model, but they do allow the user to avoid the server overhead costs associated with remote browser isolation solutions.

Mechanism
Browser isolation typically leverages virtualization or containerization technology to isolate the users web browsing activity away from the endpoint device - significantly reducing the attack surface for rogue links and files. Browser isolation is a way to isolate web browsing hosts and other high-risk behaviors away from mission-critical data and infrastructure. Browser isolation is a process to physically isolate a user's browsing activity away from local networks and infrastructure, isolating malware and browser based cyber-attacks in the process while still granting full access.

Market
In 2017, the American research group Gartner identified remote browser (browser isolation) as one of the top technologies for security. The same Gartner report also forecast that more than 50% of enterprises would actively begin to isolate their internet browsing to reduce the impact of cyber attacks over the coming three years.

According to Market Research Media, the remote browser isolation (RBI) market is forecast to reach $10 Billion by 2024, growing at CAGR 30% in the period 2019–2024.

Comparison to other techniques 
Unlike traditional web security approaches such as antivirus software and secure web gateways, browser isolation is a zero trust approach which does not rely on filtering content based on known threat patterns or signatures. Traditional approaches can't handle 0-day attacks since the threat patterns are unknown. Rather, browser isolation approach treats all websites and other web content that has not been explicitly whitelisted as untrusted, and isolates them from the local device in a virtual environment such as a container or virtual machine.

Web-based files can be rendered remotely so that end users can access them within the browser, without downloading them. Alternatively, files can be sanitized within the virtual environment, using file cleansing technologies such as Content Disarm & Reconstruction (CDR), allowing for secure file downloads to the user device.

Effectiveness 
Typically browser isolation solutions provide their users with 'disposable' (non-persistent) browser environments, once the browsing session is closed or times out, the entire browser environment is reset to a known good state or simply discarded. Any malicious code encountered during that session is thus prevented from reaching the endpoint or persisting within the network, regardless of whether any threat is detected. In this way, browser isolation proactively combats both known, unknown and zero-day threats, effectively complementing other security measures and contributing to a defense-in-depth, layered approach to web security.

History
Browser isolation began as an evolution of the 'security through physical isolation' cybersecurity model and is also known as the air-gap model by security professionals, who have been physically isolating critical networks, users and infrastructures for cybersecurity purposes for decades.  Although techniques to breach 'air-gapped' IT systems exist, they typically require physical access or close proximity to the air-gapped system in order to be effective.  The use of an air-gap makes infiltration into systems from the public internet extremely difficult, if not impossible without physical access to the system .  The first commercial browser isolation platforms were leveraged by the National Nuclear Security Administration at Lawrence Livermore National Laboratory, Los Alamos National Laboratory and Sandia National Laboratories in 2009, when browser isolation platforms based on virtualization were used to deliver non-persistent virtual desktops to thousands of federal government users.

In June 2018, the Defense Information Systems Agency (DISA) announced a request for information for a "cloud-based internet isolation" solution as part of its endpoint security portfolio. As the RFI puts it, "the service would redirect the act of internet browsing from the end user’s desktop into a remote server, external to the Department of Defense Information Network." At the time, the RFI was the largest known project for browser isolation, seeking "a cloud based service leveraging concurrent (simultaneous) use licenses at ~60% of the total user base (3.1 Million users)."

See also
 Malware
 Internet safety
 Browser security
 Antivirus software

References 

Web browsers
Web security exploits
Internet security